A general election in the state of Montana was held on Tuesday, November 3, 2020, with the primary elections being held on June 2, 2020. Voters will elect one member to United States House of Representatives and all five state constitutional offices, among other elected offices.

Governor

Secretary of State

Incumbent Republican Montana Secretary of State Corey Stapleton was elected in 2016 with 55.5% of the vote. Stapleton has announced he would not seek re-election, instead running for the open U.S. House seat in Montana.

Republican primary

Candidates

Declared
Bowen Greenwood, clerk for the Montana State Supreme Court
Christi Jacobsen, chief of staff to Montana Secretary of State Corey Stapleton
Brad Johnson, Montana Public Service Commissioner and former Montana Secretary of State (2005–2009)
Kurt Johnson
Forrest Mandeville, state representative
Scott Sales, president of the Montana State Senate

Declined
Corey Stapleton, incumbent Montana Secretary of State

Results

Democratic primary

Candidates

Declared
Bryce Bennett, state senator

Results

General election

Polling

Results

Attorney General

Incumbent Republican Montana Attorney General Tim Fox was re-elected in 2016 with 67.7% of the vote. Fox is term-limited and cannot run for re-election. Fox decided to run for the Governor of Montana election.

Republican primary

Candidates

Nominee
Austin Knudsen, Roosevelt County Attorney, and former speaker of the Montana House of Representatives

Eliminated in primary
Jon Bennion, chief deputy Attorney General

Results

Democratic primary

Candidates

Nominee
Raph Graybill, chief legal counsel to Governor Steve Bullock

Eliminated in primary
Kimberly Dudik, state representative

Withdrawn
Jim Cossitt, bankruptcy attorney

Declined
John Morrison, former Montana State Auditor

Results

Green primary

Candidates

Disqualified
Roy Davis

Results

General election

Polling

Results

Montana State Senate

Montana State House

Public Service Commission
Three of five seats on the Montana Public Service Commission - Districts 2, 3 and 4 - were up for election on November 3, 2020, with party primaries scheduled for June 2.

State Auditor
Incumbent Republican Montana State Auditor Matt Rosendale was elected in 2016 with 53.8% of the vote. Rosendale announced he would not seek re-election, instead opting to run for the open U.S. House seat in Montana.

Republican primary

Candidates

Nominee

Troy Downing, businessman and candidate for U.S. Senate in 2018

Eliminated in primary
Nelly Nicol, businesswoman
Scott Tuxbury, insurance underwriting firm owner

Declined
Matt Rosendale, incumbent Montana State Auditor (running for U.S. House)

Results

Democratic primary

Candidates

Nominee
Shane Morigeau, state representative

Eliminated in primary
Mike Windsor, attorney

Results

General election

Results

Superintendent of Public Instruction 
Incumbent Republican Montana Superintendent of Public Instruction Elsie Arntzen was elected in 2016 with 51.6% of the vote.

Republican primary

Candidates

Declared
Elsie Arntzen, incumbent Montana Superintendent of Public Instruction

Results

Democratic primary

Candidates

Declared
Melissa Romano, fourth grade teacher and nominee for Montana Superintendent of Public Instruction in 2016

Results

General election

Polling

Results

Supreme Court
The terms of Montana Supreme Court justices for Seats 5 and 6 expire at the end of 2020. A nonpartisan primary for the two seats is scheduled for June 2, and the nonpartisan election on November 3.

Ballot measures 
 Montana LR-130, Limit Local Government Authority to Regulate Firearms Measure
 Montana C-46, Initiated Amendment Distribution Requirements Measure
 Montana C-47, Initiated Statute and Referendum Distribution Requirements Amendment
 Montana CI-118, Allow for a Legal Age for Marijuana Amendment
 Montana I-190, the Montana Marijuana Legalization and Tax Initiative

Polling 

On Legislative Referendum 130

Notes

Partisan clients

References

External links
 
 
  (State affiliate of the U.S. League of Women Voters)
 

Official campaign websites for Secretary of State
 Bryce Bennett (D) for Secretary of State 
 Christi Jacobsen (R) for Secretary of State

Official campaign websites for Attorney General
 Raph Graybill (D) for Attorney General
 Austin Knudsen (R) for Attorney General

Official campaign websites for State Auditor
 Troy Downing (R) for Auditor
 Shane Morigeau (D) for Auditor 

Official campaign websites for Superintendent of Public Instruction
 Elsie Arntzen (R) for Superintendent 
 Melissa Romano (D) for Superintendent

 
Montana